Zachary Ottow (born ) is an American mixed martial artist who formerly competed in the welterweight division of the Ultimate Fighting Championship (UFC). A professional competitor since 2011, he has also competed for King of the Cage.

Background
Ottow was born and raised in Milwaukee, Wisconsin with an older biological brother and two older stepbrothers. Ottow started training in wrestling and football – becoming an All-State select in latter – while attending Wisconsin Lutheran High School. He attended Air Force Academy in Colorado for two years before transferring to University of Wisconsin in Milwaukee from where he graduated with a degree in kinesiology.

After his college football career had finished, he begun training Brazilian jiu-jitsu and later picking up kickboxing. Eventually he started mixed martial arts training and started his professional career not long after. Ottow's typical day of training splits into three sessions.  He starts his early morning with strength and conditional training; he works on his wrestling or boxing during the midday, and finishes off his day with BJJ training.

Mixed martial arts career

Early career
Ottow participated in various regional MMA promotions primarily in the Upper Midwest such as King of the Cage, North American Fighting Championship, and Legacy Fighting Championship. He amassed a record of 13–3 prior signed by Ultimate Fighting Championship (UFC).

Ultimate Fighting Championship
Ottow made his promotional debut on a short notice, replacing Bobby Green against Josh Burkman on October 1, 2016 at UFC Fight Night: Lineker vs. Dodson. He won the fight via split decision.

Ottow faced Sérgio Moraes on November 19, 2016 at UFC Fight Night: Bader vs. Nogueira 2. Moraes was awarded a split decision victory.

Ottow next faced Kiichi Kunimoto on June 11, 2017 at UFC Fight Night: Lewis vs. Hunt. He won the fight via split decision.

Ottow faced Li Jingliang on November 25, 2017 at UFC Fight Night: Silva vs. Gastelum. He lost the fight via TKO in the first round. After the bout Ottow became a free agent having fought his contract out.

Ottow then signed a new four-fight contract to face Mike Pyle on short notice on March 3, 2018 at UFC 222. He won the fight by technical knockout in the first round. Pyle had announced he would retire before the fight.

Ottow faced Sage Northcutt on July 14, 2018 at UFC Fight Night 133. He lost the fight via knock out in round two.

Ottow replaced Erik Koch to face promotional newcomer Dwight Grant on December 15, 2018 at UFC on Fox 31. He won the fight by split decision.

Ottow faced Alex Morono on March 9, 2019 at UFC on ESPN+ 4. He lost the fight via a verbal submission due to elbows in the first round. Having fought out his contract, Ottow became a free agent as the UFC opted not to renew his contract.

Post UFC 
Ottow faced Clarence Jordan at Cages Aggression 29 on November 20, 2020. He won the bout via armbar in the second round.

Ottow faced Jarome Hatch on July 31, 2021 at North Iowa Fights: Hatch vs. Ottow. He won the bout via unanimous decision.

Ottow faced Derek Smith at A-Town Throwdown 17 on January 15, 2022. He won the bout via guillotine choke in the first round.

Ottow faced Kyle Stewart on April 2, 2022 at XMMA 4. He won the bout via unanimous decision.

Personal life
Ottow worked as a bartender and worked in Wall Street for a year before making his career choice to be a professional fighter.

He owns Pura Vida BJJ & MMA.

Mixed martial arts record

|-
|Loss
|align=center| 20–8
| Kyle Stewart
| Decision (unanimous)
| XMMA 4: Black Magic
| 
|align=center|3
|align=center|5:00
| New Orleans, Louisiana, United States
|
|-
| Win
| align=center| 20–7
| Derek Smith
| Submission (guillotine choke)
| A-Town Throwdown 17
| 
| align=center| 1
| align=center| 2:59
| Austin, Minnesota, United States
|
|-
| Win
| align=center| 19–7
| Jarome Hatch
| Decision (unanimous)
| North Iowa Fights: Hatch vs. Ottow
| 
| align=center| 3
| align=center| 5:00
| Mason City, Iowa, United States
|
|-
| Win
| align=center| 18–7
| Clarence Jordan
| Submission (armbar)
| Caged Aggression 29: Determination Day 1
| 
| align=center| 2
| align=center| 2:37
| Davenport, Iowa, United States
|
|-
|Loss
|align=center| 17–7
|Alex Morono
|TKO (submission to elbows)
|UFC Fight Night: Lewis vs. dos Santos 
|
|align=center|1
|align=center|3:34
|Wichita, Kansas, United States
|
|-
|Win
|align=center| 17–6
|Dwight Grant
|Decision (split)
|UFC on Fox: Lee vs. Iaquinta 2
|
|align=center|3
|align=center|5:00
|Milwaukee, Wisconsin, United States
|
|-
|Loss
|align=center| 16–6
|Sage Northcutt
|KO (punches)
|UFC Fight Night: dos Santos vs. Ivanov
|
|align=center|2
|align=center|3:13
|Boise, Idaho, United States
|
|- 
|Win
|align=center| 16–5
|Mike Pyle
|TKO (punches)
|UFC 222 
|
|align=center|1
|align=center|2:34
|Las Vegas, Nevada, United States
|
|- 
|Loss
|align=center| 15–5
|Li Jingliang
|TKO (punches)
|UFC Fight Night: Bisping vs. Gastelum
|
|align=center|1
|align=center|2:57
|Shanghai, China
|
|-
| Win
| align=center| 15–4
| Kiichi Kunimoto
| Decision (split)
| UFC Fight Night: Lewis vs. Hunt
| 
| align=center| 3
| align=center| 5:00
| Auckland, New Zealand
|
|-
| Loss
| align=center| 14–4
| Sérgio Moraes
| Decision (split)
| UFC Fight Night: Bader vs. Nogueira 2
| 
| align=center| 3
| align=center| 5:00
| São Paulo, Brazil
|
|-
| Win
| align=center| 14–3
| Josh Burkman
| Decision (split)
| UFC Fight Night: Lineker vs. Dodson
| 
| align=center| 3
| align=center| 5:00
| Portland, Oregon, United States
|
|-
| Win
| align=center| 13–3
| Craig Eckelberg
| Decision (unanimous)
| Pure FC 4
| 
| align=center| 3
| align=center| 5:00
| Milwaukee, Wisconsin, United States
|
|-
| Win
| align=center| 12–3
| Frank Schuman
| Submission (guillotine choke)
| KOTC: Total Devastation
| 
| align=center| 3
| align=center| 3:23
| Lac Du Flambeau, Wisconsin, United States
|
|-
| Win
| align=center| 11–3
| Jay Ellis
| Submission (rear-naked choke)
| KOTC: Shattered
| 
| align=center| 1
| align=center| 0:26
| Keshena, Wisconsin, United States
|
|-
| Win
| align=center| 10–3
| Richard Wolfe
| Submission (guillotine choke)
| KOTC: Title at the Torch
| 
| align=center| 1
| align=center| 1:33
| Lac Du Flambeau, Wisconsin, United States
|
|-
| Loss
| align=center| 9–3
| Jacob Volkmann
| Technical Submission (brabo choke)
| Legacy Fighting Championship 43
| 
| align=center| 1
| align=center| 4:55
| Hinckley, Minnesota, United States
|
|-
| Win
| align=center| 9–2
| Robbie Gotreau
| TKO
| KOTC: Public Enemy
| 
| align=center| 1
| align=center| 4:27
| Carlton, Minnesota, United States
|
|-
| Win
| align=center| 8–2
| Eddie Larrea
| Submission (arm-triangle choke)
| KOTC: Beastmaster
| 
| align=center| 1
| align=center| 1:53
| Keshena, Wisconsin, United States
|
|-
| Win
| align=center| 7–2
| Nathan Howe
| Submission (arm-triangle choke)
| Resurrection Fighting Alliance 19 
| 
| align=center| 2
| align=center| 0:54
| Prior Lake, Minnesota, United States
|
|-

| Loss
| align=center| 6–2
| Zach Micklewright
| TKO (punches)
| Caged Aggression 12
| 
| align=center| 2
| align=center| 1:04
| Davenport, Iowa, United States
|
|-
| Win
| align=center| 6–1
| Quinton McCottrell
| Submission (rear-naked choke)
| NAFC: Battle in the Ballroom
| 
| align=center| 2
| align=center| 1:05
| Milwaukee, Wisconsin, United States
|
|-
| Win
| align=center| 5–1
| Eddie Larrea
| Submission (rear-naked choke)
| KOTC: Train Wreck
| 
| align=center| 1
| align=center| 2:45
| Lac Du Flambeau, Wisconsin, United States
|
|-
| Win
| align=center| 4–1
| Matt Gauthier
| Submission (arm-triangle choke)
| Resurrection Fighting Alliance 8
| 
| align=center| 1
| align=center| 3:07
| Milwaukee, Wisconsin, United States
|
|-
| Win
| align=center| 3–1
| Jesse Midas
| TKO (punches)
| Driller Promotions: Caged Chaos
| 
| align=center| 1
| align=center| 4:00
| Shakopee, Minnesota, United States
|
|-
| Win
| align=center| 2–1
| Ricky Stettner
| Submission (choke)
| NAFC: Battleground
| 
| align=center| 2
| align=center| 2:27
| Milwaukee, Wisconsin, United States
|
|-
| Win
| align=center| 1–1
| Jim Klimczyk
| TKO (submission to punches)
| KOTC: New Vision
| 
| align=center| 1
| align=center| 4:37
| Morton, Minnesota, United States
|
|-
| Loss
| align=center| 0–1
| Mike Rhodes
| Decision (unanimous)
| NAFC: Colosseum
| 
| align=center| 3
| align=center| 5:00
| Milwaukee, Wisconsin, United States
|
|-

See also
 List of current UFC fighters
 List of male mixed martial artists

References

External links

1986 births
Living people
American male mixed martial artists
Welterweight mixed martial artists
Sportspeople from Milwaukee
Mixed martial artists from Wisconsin
Mixed martial artists utilizing taekwondo
Mixed martial artists utilizing boxing
Mixed martial artists utilizing wrestling
Mixed martial artists utilizing Brazilian jiu-jitsu
United States Air Force Academy alumni
University of Wisconsin–Milwaukee alumni
Ultimate Fighting Championship male fighters
American male taekwondo practitioners
American practitioners of Brazilian jiu-jitsu
People awarded a black belt in Brazilian jiu-jitsu